Piper Madison (born March 10, 2002) is an American Billboard top 40 recording artist and songwriter, multi-instrumentalist and actress.

Television
Madison appeared as Zelphaba in the Nickelodeon television series 100 Things to Do Before High School and won a Young Artist Award for her role in 2016.

Discography
On July 1, 2019, Madison released her debut album, Who's Running Your Mind.  Her single "Little Bit of Rain", remixed by Chris Cox and Jared Lee Gosselin, debuted on the Billboard Dance Club Songs at No. 46 on September 14, 2019, and reached its peak at No. 14 on October 26, 2019. Madison performed at SXSW music festival in 2019. Madison released her holiday EP, Snowfall, on November 15, 2019.

Albums

Singles

References

External links

2002 births
Living people
Singer-songwriters from Kentucky
American women rock singers
21st-century American women guitarists
21st-century American guitarists
21st-century American actresses
Actresses from Kentucky
American multi-instrumentalists
21st-century American women singers
American women singer-songwriters
21st-century American singers